Eric Sheffer Stevens (born June 19, 1972) is an American actor. He played Dr. Reid Oliver on the CBS soap opera As the World Turns, first appearing in January 2010. From 2011 to 2012, he co-starred on the Fox sitcom I Hate My Teenage Daughter alongside Jaime Pressly.

Filmography

Film

Television

References

External links
 

1972 births
21st-century American male actors
American male film actors
American male soap opera actors
American male television actors
Living people
Male actors from Sacramento, California